Common (1888–1912) was a British Thoroughbred racehorse and sire. In a career that lasted from May to September  1891 he ran five times and won four  races. He became the fifth, and the most lighty-raced horse to win the English Triple Crown by winning the 2000 Guineas at Newmarket, the Derby at Epsom and the St Leger at Doncaster.

Background
Common was a “big, lathy, sinewy”  brown horse, standing just over 16 hands high bred at Crichel in Dorset by Henry Sturt, 1st Baron Alington who owned him during his racing career in partnership with Sir Frederick Johnstone. The colt was sent into training with John Porter at Kingsclere, and was ridden in all his races by George Barrett.
Common's sire Isonomy was one of the outstanding British racehorses of the 19th Century, winning the Ascot Gold Cup in 1879 and 1880. He went on to become a successful stallion; apart from Common he sired Isinglass, thus being the first of two horses to father  two winners of the English Triple Crown. Common's dam Thistle, who had been a successful racehorse, went on to produce the New Stakes winner Goldfinch and the filly Throstle who won the St Leger in 1894.

Racing career

1891: three-year-old season

Spring: 2000 Guineas
Common was very immature as a two-year-old and Porter decided not to race him. In the spring of 1891 Common showed significant progress and produced impressive performances in training. Before he appeared on the racecourse his potential was noted by the Sporting Times who described him as an "exceedingly fine" colt. In a gallop viewed by his owners together with the Prince of Wales he easily defeated his stable companions Gone Coon and Orion, leading Porter to name the colt as a likely Classic winner. In the 2000 Guineas on 29 April he started at odds of 9/1 in a field of nine, with the French-trained Gouverneur and Peter Flower heading the betting. Shortly before the start his odds had drifted out from 7/1 with one commentator suggesting that the public were put off by his unappealing name. The runners made an even break and raced in a line across the wide Newmarket straight. Two furlongs from the finish Peter Flower showed in front but was immediately overtaken by Common who pulled clear "without an effort" and won very easily by three lengths from Orvieto, with Peter Flower in third.

Summer: Epsom Derby

At Epsom on 27 May, Common started 10/11 favourite in a field of eleven for the Derby. The conditions for the race were difficult, with mist, hail, driving rain and very soft ground. Gouverneur, whose rider's orange jacket made him one of the more visible runners, led the field in the early running, with Common first being sighted in fifth place just after half way. The French colt turned into the straight in front, with Common improving in fourth. Barrett produced Common to dispute the lead two furlongs from the finish. After racing alongside Gouverneur for a few strides, Barrett, riding in the "coolest manner" sent him clear to win "in a canter" by two lengths. Common had been heavily backed and his win was enthusiastically received despite the conditions. The rain had been so heavy that the sodden jockeys returned from the race up to three pounds heavier, and Barrett's face was described as having "enough mud on it to plant potatoes in."

Common was then sent to Royal Ascot for the St. James's Palace Stakes. Only one horse, Barbatello,  opposed him and he won easily. His next race was the Eclipse Stakes at Sandown Park Racecourse in which he faced older horses for the first time. Common started favourite at 1/2 ahead of the four-year-olds Memoir and Surefoot. Common disputed the lead with Gouverneur from the start until the closing stages when the two three-year-olds were joined by Surefoot. In a "most exciting" finish, Surefoot prevailed by half a length, with Gouverneur beating Common for second by a short head.

Autumn: St Leger

Common was then sent to Doncaster for the St Leger on 10 September in an attempt to complete the Triple Crown. His main challenger appeared to be the filly Mimi who was bidding to complete her own version of the Triple Crown, having won both the 1000 Guineas and the Oaks. Common started 4/5 favourite ahead of Mimi on 5/1 and the heavily-backed French colt Reverend on 11/2. Reverend took an early lead, and set a strong pace in an attempt to expose any weaknesses in Common's stamina. The French colt maintained his lead into the straight, just ahead of Common and the outsider St Simon of the Rock. Common came under pressure and appeared to be beaten but responded well and a furlong from the finish the three colts were level. In the closing stages Common began to pull ahead and after a "splendid race" he crossed the line a length in front of Reverend, with St Simon of the Rock a neck away in third. The race was described by one London correspondent as "one of the finest that have been witnessed in the North for many years."

Shortly after his win in the St Leger, Common's owners  sold the colt for £15,000 to John Blundell Maple, the Conservative M.P. and owner of the Childwick Bury Stud, having previously turned down an offer of £14,000 from the Austrian government. Blundell Maple attempted to arrange a match race between Common and the Doncaster Cup winner Queen's Birthday over two miles, but his challenge was not accepted. Porter refused to train for Blundell Maple and as a result, Common did not race again and was retired to stud.

Assessment
Porter said of Common that if he had stayed in training he would have “proved one of the greatest Cup horses of modern times."

Stud career
Common was not a success at stud, a fact illustrated by his stud fee, which fell from 200 guineas in his first season to 19 guineas. He did sire one very good horse in the filly Nun Nicer who won the 1000 Guineas in 1898. Common died on 17 December 1912, at a stud near Chelmsford, Essex.

Pedigree

References

1888 racehorse births
1912 racehorse deaths
Racehorses trained in the United Kingdom
Racehorses bred in the United Kingdom
Epsom Derby winners
Triple Crown of Thoroughbred Racing winners
Thoroughbred family 4-c
2000 Guineas winners
St Leger winners